Tima Džebo, née Imširević (born 24 October 1963 in Olovo) is a former Yugoslav and Bosnian female basketball player. She represented Yugoslavia and won a silver at the 1990 FIBA World Championship for Women in Malaysia, and later won a gold while representing Bosnia and Herzegovina at the 1993 Mediterranean Games.

References

External links
Profile at fiba.com
Interview for oslobodjenje.ba

1963 births
Living people
Bosnia and Herzegovina women's basketball players
Yugoslav women's basketball players
ŽKK Željezničar Sarajevo players
Mediterranean Games gold medalists for Bosnia and Herzegovina
Mediterranean Games medalists in basketball
Competitors at the 1993 Mediterranean Games
ŽKK Jedinstvo Tuzla players